Montfermeil is a commune in the eastern suburbs of Paris, France.

Montfermeil is famous as the location of Thénardiers' inn in Les Misérables. It has made the headlines due to troubles in its social estate called "les Bosquets".

Population

Heraldry

Points of interest

 Parc Arboretum de Montfermeil
 Sempin Windmill

Economy
Montfermeil at one time had the head office of Titus Software.

Transport
Montfermeil is served by two stations of the Paris Métro, RER, or suburban rail network. The closest stations are Le Raincy–Villemomble–Montfermeil station  and Le Chénay-Gagny.

Education
Schools in Montfermeil:
Seven combined preschools and elementary schools: L'Arc en Ciel, Paul Eluard, Jules Ferry, Danielle Casanova, Victor Hugo, Jean-Baptiste Clement, and Joliot Curie
Junior high schools: Jean Jaures and Pablo Picasso

Notable people

Emre Akbaba, footballer
Samba Diakité, footballer
Metehan Güçlü, footballer
Ladj Ly, filmmaker
Aïssa Laïdouni, footballer
Larrys Mabiala, footballer
Christopher Maboulou, footballer
Kamulete Makiese, footballer 
Orphee Neola, athlete
Kevynn Nyokas, handball player
Olivier Nyokas, handball player
Henri Pescarolo, racing driver
Listner Pierre-Louis, footballer
Johny Placide, footballer
Christian Potel, former professional footballer
Mamadou Samassa, footballer
Joel Sami, footballer

See also

Communes of the Seine-Saint-Denis department

References

External links

Official website (in French)

Communes of Seine-Saint-Denis